Welcome to the Neighbourhood is the seventh studio album by American rock singer Meat Loaf, released in 1995 as the follow-up to his successful comeback album Bat Out of Hell II: Back into Hell. It went platinum in the United States and United Kingdom.

The album is thought of as a concept album, as all of the songs are ordered in the track listing as to tell a story about a relationship throughout the years. Three singles were released: "I'd Lie for You (And That's the Truth)" (a duet with Patti Russo), "Not a Dry Eye in the House" and "Runnin' for the Red Light (I Gotta Life)". They reached #2, #7 and #21 in the UK charts, with the first two written by Diane Warren, who later also wrote songs for Meat Loaf's albums Couldn't Have Said It Better and Bat Out of Hell III: The Monster Is Loose. In some markets, radio stations also played "Amnesty Is Granted", though it was not released as an official single. Despite the chart success of the album and its singles, only "Amnesty is Granted" has appeared on an official live album, Casa De Carne (Live 2008) as a bonus CD with Hang Cool Teddy Bear. "I'd Lie for You (And That's the Truth)" was recorded as a sound check with the Melbourne Symphony Orchestra, but only included as a bonus download track.

Of the twelve songs on the album, two are covers of songs from Jim Steinman projects; "Original Sin" first appeared on Pandora's Box's Original Sin album (it was also heard in the movie The Shadow, where it was performed by Taylor Dayne), and "Left in the Dark" first appeared on Steinman's own album Bad for Good.

Cover art
The theme on the cover art and inside booklet is that of detective novels of the 1950s. The booklet, aside from having the lyrics for every song, features a "Detective Novel" per song with modified titles to accommodate the titles of the songs. At least one image, the one associated with "Where Angels Sing" (the final track on the album), is easily recognizable: it is the same image, only with slightly altered colors, as in the movie poster for Lolita, Stanley Kubrick's film adaption of the controversial same-titled novel by Vladimir Nabokov; the typeface used to write "Where Angels Sing" is also the same one as in the poster. This style was also used for the three singles released off the album, with the cover art for each of them being its correspondent novel from the booklet.

Track listing

Collector's edition
In 2011, a three disc collector's edition was released. The first disc includes the songs on the original release with four additional tracks.

The second disc was recorded live at the Beacon Theatre on 23 October 1995, except tracks 10 and 11 (recorded in 1989). Track 9 is, by mistake, the studio track.

The third disc is a five track DVD.

Personnel

Arrangements
 Rory Dodd, Kasim Sulton – background vocal arrangers

Band
 Meat Loaf – lead vocals

The Neverland Express
 Pat Thrall – guitars (2–5, 7, 8, 10, 12)
 Kasim Sulton – acoustic guitars (8), backing vocals
 Steve Buslowe – bass guitar
 Mark Alexander – piano (2–5, 7–12)
 John Miceli – drums (12)
 Patti Russo – female lead vocals (2, 10)
 Pearl Aday – backing vocals (1, 2, 5)

Regular Meat Loaf studio sidemen
 Tim Pierce – guitars (1–3, 5, 7–10, 12)
 Eddie Martinez – guitars (9)
 Paul Jacobs – piano (1)
 Jeff Bova – keyboards, Hammond B3 (2, 4), programming (6)
 Kenny Aronoff – drums
 Rory Dodd – backing vocals
 Curtis King – backing vocals (1, 2, 7–10, 12)

Special appearances
 Sammy Hagar – additional vocals and guitars (9)
 Steven Van Zandt – guitars (9)
 Susan Wood – female lead vocals (4)
 Elaine Caswell – backing vocals (3, 5)

Charts

Weekly charts

Year-end charts

References

Meat Loaf albums
1995 albums
Albums produced by Steven Van Zandt
Albums produced by Ron Nevison